Henryk Paweł Apostel (born 29 January 1941 in Beuthen) is a retired Polish football player and manager.

He played for Polonia Bytom, Legia Warsaw, Orły Chicago, Śląsk Wrocław and Polonia Warsaw. He capped once for Poland.

He managed Pogoń Siedlce, Poland U-18, Poland U-21, Śląsk Wrocław, Lech Poznań, Orły Chicago, Górnik Zabrze, Poland, Wisła Kraków and KSZO Ostrowiec Świętokrzyski.

References

1941 births
Living people
Polish footballers
Polish expatriate footballers
Poland international footballers
Polonia Bytom players
Legia Warsaw players
Śląsk Wrocław players
Polonia Warsaw players
Polish football managers
Lech Poznań managers
Górnik Zabrze managers
Poland national football team managers
Wisła Kraków managers
Śląsk Wrocław managers
Sportspeople from Bytom
Expatriate soccer players in the United States
Polish expatriate sportspeople in the United States
Association football forwards
MKP Pogoń Siedlce managers
Polish expatriate football managers